Scopula pseudodoxa is a moth of the family Geometridae. It was described by Louis Beethoven Prout in 1920. It is found on Woodlark Island in Papua New Guinea.

References

pseudodoxa
Endemic fauna of Papua New Guinea
Moths of New Guinea
Woodlark Islands
Moths described in 1920